The 1999–2000 season was the ninth time Tennis Borussia Berlin played in the 2. Bundesliga, the second highest tier of the German football league system. After 34 league games, Tennis Borussia finished 13th. Saša Ćirić scored 14 of the club's 42 league goals. However, ten days following the last round of league games, the German Football Association revoked TeBe's license for the following season, and as a result, the club were relegated instead of the Stuttgarter Kickers. The club made it to the third round of the DFB-Pokal where they lost 3–2 after extra time to Hertha BSC. The club's reserve team, Tennis Borussia Berlin (Amateure), won the Berliner Landespokal, beating Berliner FC Dynamo 2–0 in the final at the Friedrich-Ludwig-Jahn-Sportpark.

1999–2000 Tennis Borussia Berlin squad

1999–2000 fixtures

Player statistics

Final league position – 13th

References

External links 
 1999–2000 Tennis Borussia Berlin season – squad and statistics at fussballdaten.de 

Tennis Borussia Berlin seasons
German football clubs 1999–2000 season